Anita Weiß (née Barkusky, later married Kehl and Marg; born 16 July 1955 in Burow) is a retired East German athlete who specialized in the 800 metres and later also 400 metres hurdles. In the 1976 Olympics she finished fourth in the 800 metres race. As all four of the top finishers in the race broke what had been the world record prior to the 1976 Olympics, Weiß's time was the fourth fastest ever run.

She competed for the sports club SC Neubrandenburg during her active career, becoming East German champion in 1978.

Achievements

References

1955 births
Living people
East German female middle-distance runners
Athletes (track and field) at the 1976 Summer Olympics
Olympic athletes of East Germany
Sportspeople from Mecklenburg-Western Pomerania